Hurstpierpoint College is an independent, co-educational, day and boarding school for pupils aged 4–18, located just to the north of the village of Hurstpierpoint, West Sussex. The College was founded in 1849 by Canon Nathaniel Woodard and is a member of the Woodard Corporation.

Notable Old Johnians

Politics
   
 Eric Broadbridge, 2nd Baron Broadbridge, hereditary peer
 Peter Broadbridge, 3rd Baron Broadbridge, Crossbench peer
 Roger Casale, Labour Member of Parliament
 George Johnson, Member of the Newfoundland House of Assembly
 Richard Page, Conservative Member of Parliament
 Sir Desmond Plummer, Baron Plummer of St Marylebone, Conservative peer
 John Greenwood Shipman, Liberal Member of Parliament

Diplomatic Service
Sir Graham Boyce , British Ambassador to Egypt, British Ambassador to Qatar and British Ambassador to Kuwait
Sir Bryan Cartledge , British Ambassador to Russia, British Ambassador to Hungary and Principal of Linacre College, Oxford
Sir Derek Day , British High Commissioner to Canada, British Ambassador to Ethiopia and Olympic bronze medal winning field hockey player
Sir Oliver Forster , British Ambassador to Pakistan
Richard Lavers, British Ambassador to Ecuador and British Ambassador to Guatemala

Military
 Sir Roy Austen-Smith , Commander British Forces Cyprus
 Michael Boyce, Baron Boyce , First Sea Lord (1998–2001), Chief of Defence Staff (2001–2003), and Crossbench peer
 Richard Hutton Davies , army officer
 Sydney Dowse , POW escapee
 H. Dormer Legge, RAF and Army officer and philatelist
 Simon Pack , Royal Marines officer

Media and arts
 Gavin Carr, conductor
 Tony Church, Shakespearean actor
 Robert Coote, actor
 Christopher Ellison, actor
 Douglas Goldring, writer and journalist
 Richard Hadfield, singer
 Edward Hibbert, actor and agent
 Sean Li, Hong Kong film actor
 Bertram Mitford, novelist
 Ronald Neame , film director
 Barry Norman, film critic 
Christopher Nourse, arts administrator (The Guardian 2018) 
 H. A. Saintsbury, actor and playwright
 Tristan Shale-Hester, motoring journalist
 Tom Sutcliffe, opera critic
 Jamie Theakston, television and radio presenter
 Reginald Turner, author and member of the circle of Oscar Wilde
 John Ware, BBC Panorama reporter
 Patrick Wilson, composer
 Michael York , actor

Sport
 Ben Broster, Wales and Biarritz Olympique rugby player
 Noah Cato, Newcastle Falcons rugby player
 Daniel Doram, Netherlands cricketer
 William Heasman, Sussex cricketer
 Matt Machan, Sussex cricketer
 Charlie Matthews, Harlequins rugby player
 John Neal, Sussex cricketer
 Arthur Sharood, Sussex cricketer
 Martin Speight, Sussex, Durham and Northumberland cricketer
 Jamie Thompson, Oxford MCCU cricketer
 Guy Waller, Oxford University cricketer

Religion
 Walter Robert Adams, Archbishop of British Columbia and Yukon
 George Daniell, Archdeacon of Southwark
 Arthur Greaves, Bishop of Grimsby and Grantham

Other
 William Warwick Buckland, jurist
 Cecil Humphery-Smith , genealogist and heraldist
 Edward Arthur Maund, explorer
 Jack Sangster, industrialist
 Bernard Sheldon, MI5 officer
 Sir Basil Smallpeice, businessman
 Clive Deverall AM, businessman

References

Lists of people by English school affiliation
Sussex-related lists